Alun Owen is a Welsh cyclist who represented Wales in the 1994 and 1998 Commonwealth Games in Victoria and Kuala Lumpur.

Palmarès

1991
1st Welsh National Road Race Championships

1994
4th 100 km Team Time Trial 1:58:55, Commonwealth Games

1998
4th Team Pursuit, Commonwealth Games
18th Points Race, Commonwealth Games

2006
8th Welsh National Road Race Championships

References

Year of birth missing (living people)
Living people
Welsh male cyclists
Commonwealth Games competitors for Wales
Cyclists at the 1998 Commonwealth Games
Sportspeople from Cardiff